Andrea Favilli (born 17 May 1997) is an Italian professional footballer who plays as a striker for  club Ternana, on loan from Genoa.

Club career

Livorno 
Born in Pisa, Italy, Favilli started his career at Livorno's youth academy.

Loan to Juventus 
Favilli was loaned out to Juventus on 2 February 2015. He scored 22 goals with the Primavera (under-19) team. Favilli made his Serie A debut on 7 February 2016, against Frosinone, replacing Álvaro Morata after 93 minutes in a 2–0 away win.

Ascoli 
Favilli was loaned to Ascoli from Livorno for the 2016–17 season, and later sold to Ascoli for a reported €3 million. He scored 13 Serie B goals in his two-season stay.

Juventus 
On 15 June 2018, Favilli was sold to Juventus for €7.5 million, plus bonuses up to a maximum of €1.25 million.

Genoa 
On 10 August 2018, Favilli was signed by Genoa on a season-long loan for a fee of €5 million, with an option to buy for an additional €7 million. They later signed him permanently from the beginning of the next season. Favilli played 29 games in three seasons at Genoa.

Loans to Verona, Monza and Ternana 
On 18 September 2020, Favilli signed with Hellas Verona on loan until the end of the season. He made his club debut on 27 September, during which he scored his first Serie A goal in a 1–0 home win over Udinese. Favilli scored two goals in 11 appearances.

On 31 August 2021, Favilli moved to Serie B side Monza on one-year loan with an option for purchase. On 12 August 2022, Favilli was loaned to Ternana, with an option to buy.

International career
With the Italy U19 team he took part at the 2016 UEFA European Under-19 Championship, reaching the final of the tournament. With the Italy U20's, he took part at the 2017 FIFA U-20 World Cup, where Italy finished in third place. He made his debut with the Italy U21 team on 23 March 2017, in a friendly match against Poland.

Career statistics

Club

Honours
Juventus
 Serie A: 2015–16

Italy U20
 FIFA U-20 World Cup bronze medal: 2017

References

Living people
1997 births
Sportspeople from Pisa
Italian footballers
Association football forwards
U.S. Livorno 1915 players
Juventus F.C. players
Ascoli Calcio 1898 F.C. players
Genoa C.F.C. players
Hellas Verona F.C. players
A.C. Monza players
Ternana Calcio players
Serie A players
Serie B players
Italy youth international footballers
Italy under-21 international footballers
Footballers from Tuscany